Leonardo Harum Zamora Amaro (born December 14, 1975) is a Palestinian former footballer who played as a goalkeeper.

International career
Zamora made his debut with the Palestine national football team on September 24, 2003 against Qatar, in a 2004 AFC Asian Cup Qualifying match. . Also he was substitute in a World Cup 2006 Qualifying match against Uzbekistan on September 8, 2004. .

Coaching career

Assistant coach to Mario Salas
After retiring, Zamora began working with Mario Salas. He was his assistant at A.C. Barnechea between 2011 and 2012, then for Chile U20 in the 2013 FIFA U-20 World Cup and Huachipato in 2014. 

He was also Salas' assistant between 2015 and 2017, who he won the 2016 Torneo Clausura and 2016 Torneo Apertura with. They left the club at the end of 2017 when Salas accepted and offer from Sporting Cristal in Peru, which he accepted. However, Zamora decided to stay in Chile and separate with Salas, with whom he had been working under for several years.

Rangers de Talca
Zamora was hired in his first job as a head coach by his former club, Rangers de Talca, on 23 December 2017. Zamora decided to resign on 30 July 2018 due to bad results and a horrible relationship with the club's fans.

Barnechea
On 21 December 2019 it was confirmed, that Zamora had been appointed head coach of A.C. Barnechea. He was released at the beginning of 2020.

Honours

Player
Universidad de Chile
 Primera División de Chile (1): 1995

References

External links
BDFA

MyBestPlay

1975 births
Living people
People from San Felipe, Chile
Palestinian footballers
Palestinian expatriate footballers
Palestinian football managers
Palestine international footballers
Chilean footballers
Chilean expatriate footballers
Chilean football managers
Chilean people of Palestinian descent
Citizens of the State of Palestine through descent
Chilean emigrants to Palestine
Universidad de Chile footballers
Deportes Temuco footballers
Everton de Viña del Mar footballers
Utah Blitzz players
Real Salt Lake players
Ñublense footballers
Rangers de Talca footballers
Smouha SC players
Curicó Unido footballers
Chilean Primera División players
Primera B de Chile players
USL Second Division players
Egyptian Premier League players
Association football goalkeepers
Rangers de Talca managers
Primera B de Chile managers
Chilean expatriate sportspeople in the United States
Chilean expatriate sportspeople in Egypt
Palestinian expatriate sportspeople in the United States
Palestinian expatriate sportspeople in Chile
Palestinian expatriate sportspeople in Egypt
Expatriate soccer players in the United States
Expatriate footballers in Chile
Expatriate football managers in Chile
Expatriate footballers in Egypt